Karen Stewart could refer to:  

Karen B. Stewart, U.S. diplomat
Karen Weldin Stewart, Insurance Commissioner for the State of Delaware